Ponaganset High School is a school of the Foster-Glocester School District, located in Glocester, Rhode Island in Providence County. (It has a North Scituate, Rhode Island address for postal purposes.) The majority of high school students live in the rural towns of Glocester and Foster, Rhode Island. This is a public high school, known for its music program, AP and honors classes, as well as its CTE approved pathways; Plant Systems, Animal Systems, Materials and Manufacturing, Pre-Engineering, Music Technology, Music Performance, and Pending Programs: Computer Science and Information Technology, and Biomedical.  The school's athletic teams are known as the "Chieftains," and the FIRST Robotics Competition Team is known as "5112, The Gongoliers." The principal is Renee Palazzo.

Demographics
The demographic breakdown of the 722 students enrolled for 2012-2013 was:
Male - 51.5%
Female - 48.5%
Asian/Pacific islanders - 0.1%
Black - 0.3%
Hispanic - 0.3%
White - 99.2%
Multiracial - 0.1%

Additionally, 18% of the students were eligible for free or reduced lunch.

Mascot
Ponaganset's mascot is the Chieftain. This has come under fire in recent decades as mascots with Native American imagery and symbolism has been reviewed. The regional school district is now deciding whether to keep a symbol many consider to be cultural appropriation, or to change it to something more appropriate as the local tribe, the Nipmuc, have been asking for.

Capital improvement plan 
In the late 2000s, the school underwent a major multi-phase renovation in which the former middle school was re-located to a new building and the existing high school took over the old middle school structure. An indoor glass walkway was put in to attach the high school with the old middle school. The renovations were completed at the end of 2009.

Notable alumni
Sherwood C. Spring, retired United States Army Colonel and former NASA astronaut and graduate of the Class of 1963.

References

North Scituate, Rhode Island
Schools in Providence County, Rhode Island
Public high schools in Rhode Island
Scituate, Rhode Island